Italia was an Italian ironclad battleship built for the Italian Regia Marina (Royal Navy), the lead ship of the . She and her single sister ship, had lengthy construction times. Italia was laid down in January 1876, launched in September 1880, and completed in October 1885. Unusually for ships of that era, Italia had an armored deck rather than the typical belt armor.

Italia spent the first two decades of her career in the Active and Reserve Squadrons, where she took part in annual training maneuvers with the rest of the fleet. She was withdrawn from service in 1905 for a significant modernization. Upon returning to service in 1909, Italia was employed as a training ship. During the Italo-Turkish War of 1911–1912, the ship provided fire support to Italian troops defending Tripoli in Libya. She was used as a floating battery at Brindisi after Italy entered World War I in 1915. The ship was rebuilt as a grain carrier in December 1917 – June 1918. Italia served in this capacity for only a short time, being stricken in November 1921 and then scrapped.

Design

The Italia class, designed by Benedetto Brin, was ordered  in the mid-1870s as part of a naval construction program aimed at countering the Austro-Hungarian Navy. These included more powerful main guns, higher freeboard, and greater speed. Their speed came at the expense of armor protection, and their hulls carried only light deck plating.

She had a crew of 37 officers and 719 enlisted men.

Her propulsion system consisted of four compound steam engines each driving a single screw propeller, with steam supplied by sixteen coal-fired, oval fire-tube boilers.

Italia was armed with a main battery of four  guns, mounted in two pairs en echelon in a central barbette. Three guns were 26-caliber guns, while the fourth was a slightly longer 27-caliber version. She carried a secondary battery of eight  26-caliber guns and four  23-caliber guns. As was customary for capital ships of the period, she carried four  torpedo tubes in the hull above the waterline, two per broadside.

Unlike other ships built at the time, Italia dispensed with vertical belt armor. Brin believed that contemporary steel alloys could not effectively defeat armor-piercing shells of the day, and so he discarded it completely. The barbette had  of steel armor.

Service history

Construction – 1902

Italia was under construction for nearly 10 years. She was laid down at Regio Cantiere di Castellammare di Stabia shipyard on 3 January 1876, originally under the name Stella D'Italia. She then spent over four-and-a-half years on the building ways and was launched on 29 September 1880. She was not completed for another five years, her construction finally being finished on 16 October 1885. She nonetheless was completed 22 months before her sister Lepanto, which took almost 11 years to build. She began sea trials in December, which continued through March 1886. She failed to reach her designed speed, due insufficient steam capacity and poor ventilation for her boilers. At some point after her completion, Italia received several smaller caliber guns were added, including two  guns, twelve  40-caliber guns, twelve  Hotchkiss revolver cannon, and two machine guns.

Italia entered service on 10 January 1886 and went on her first training cruise in April. She visited a number of Italian ports, including Naples, Palermo, Cagliari, Livorno, and Palmas, before returning to the naval base at La Spezia. The ship next went on a cruise to visit ports in France, Spain, and Portugal over the course of May and June. Italia joined the navy's primary unit, the Permanent Squadron on 11 July and became its flagship on 1 August, when its commander, Vice Admiral Orengo hoisted his flag aboard the ship. In October, Italia and the rest of the squadron visited Greece and the Ottoman Empire. The ship was laid up in 1887 and saw no active service that year.

The ship was recommissioned in January 1888 and returned to the Permanent Squadron. The maneuvers consisted of close-order drills and a simulated attack on and defense of La Spezia. Later that year, the ship was present during a naval review held for the German Kaiser Wilhelm II during a visit to Italy. Italia was again placed in reserve in 1890. She spent the next five years alternating between active service and reserve status. She served as the flagship of the 2nd Division of the Active Squadron during the 1893 fleet maneuvers, along with the ironclad , the torpedo cruiser , and four torpedo boats. During the maneuvers, which lasted from 6 August to 5 September, the ships of the Active Squadron simulated a French attack on the Italian fleet. Beginning on 14 October 1894, the Italian fleet, including Italia, assembled in Genoa for a naval review held in honor of King Umberto I at the commissioning of the new ironclad . The festivities lasted three days.

That year, she served as the flagship of the unit's 3rd Division; her activities that year largely consisted of training cruises. Italia and her sister ship Lepanto nearly collided during that year's fleet maneuvers. She remained in the unit through 1896, during which time she also served as a gunnery training ship. In July, the fleet was reorganized and the Maneuver Squadron ( was created, and Italia became its flagship. Italia was not assigned to either the active or reserve squadrons in 1898, though she took part in the annual fleet maneuvers that year. In the early 1890s, the Italian Navy considered rebuilding Italia along the same lines as Enrico Dandolo, which had received new, quick-firing  guns in place of her slow 432 mm guns. Italia and her sister were to have their guns replaced with new  guns, but by 1902 this plan had been abandoned as too costly.

1905–1921

In 1905, Italia went into drydock for a major reconstruction that lasted into 1908. Her six funnels were reduced to four, and a second mast was erected. One of her 150 mm guns, six of the 57 mm guns, and eight of the 37 mm revolver cannon were removed. After returning to service in 1909, she served as a torpedo training ship based in La Spezia; she served in this capacity through 1910. The following year, she was also employed as a barracks ship. At the start of the Italo-Turkish War of 1911–1912, Italia was assigned to the 5th Division of the Italian fleet, along with her sister Lepanto and Enrico Dandolo. In December 1911, Italia and Lepanto were prepared to be sent to Tripoli, to replace the three s. There, they were to support the Italian garrison that had captured the city. The Italian Navy planned to send the two ships in large part because it had a large stockpile of 432 mm shells, but the plan was never actually carried out.

She was employed as a training ship for petty officers in December 1912, and by 1914 she was stationed in Taranto as a guard ship. Italia was laid up on 1 June 1914 and stricken from the naval register three days later. Despite having all of her secondary guns removed, the ship was towed to Brindisi on 20 April 1915, shortly before Italy entered World War I, to defend the harbor. She was formally returned to the naval register on 23 May, the day Italy declared war on Austria Hungary, and was recommissioned on 1 June as a "first class auxiliary". She remained at Brindisi until 16 December 1917, when she was taken to La Spezia for conversion into a grain carrier, retaining only two of her 119 mm guns. She was transferred initially to the Ministry of Transport on 1 June but was quickly reassigned to the State Railways on 27 July 1919. She remained there briefly, returning to the Navy on 13 January 1921. Italia was finally stricken on 16 November 1921 and subsequently broken up for scrap.

Footnotes

Notes

Citations

References

External links

 Italia (1880) Marina Militare website

Italia-class battleships
World War I battleships of Italy
1880 ships
Ships built in Castellammare di Stabia